Rudolph "Rudy" Suwara (born November 19, 1941) is an American former volleyball player who competed in the 1968 Summer Olympics.

References

External links
 http://www.blurb.com/b/2074681-from-the-bronx-to-the-beach

1941 births
Living people
American men's volleyball players
Olympic volleyball players of the United States
Volleyball players at the 1968 Summer Olympics
Volleyball players at the 1967 Pan American Games
Sportspeople from New York City
Pan American Games gold medalists for the United States
Pan American Games silver medalists for the United States
American sportspeople of Japanese descent
UC Santa Barbara Gauchos coaches
Pan American Games medalists in volleyball
Medalists at the 1967 Pan American Games
Medalists at the 1971 Pan American Games